William Thomas Fitzgerald (October 13, 1858 – January 12, 1939) was an American educator, physician, and politician who served two terms as a U.S. Representative from Ohio from 1925 to 1929.

Biography 
Born in Greenville, Ohio, Fitzgerald attended the rural schools and the Greenville High School.
He served as member of the National Guard of Ohio 1875-1882, and saw service during the Newark riots in 1877.
He graduated from the National Normal University, Lebanon, Ohio, in 1887.
He taught in the Greenville High School 1886-1889.
He graduated from the medical department of the University of Wooster, Wooster, Ohio, in 1891 and commenced practice in Greenville in 1891.
He served as member of the board of education 1906-1914.
He served as mayor of Greenville 1921-1925.

Fitzgerald was elected as a Republican to the Sixty-ninth and Seventieth Congresses (March 4, 1925 – March 3, 1929).
He served as chairman of the Committee on Revision of the Laws (Sixty-ninth Congress), Committee on Invalid Pensions (Seventieth Congress).
He was not a candidate for renomination in 1928 to the Seventy-first Congress.
He resumed the practice of medicine in Greenville, Ohio, where he died on January 12, 1939.
He was interred in Greenville Cemetery.

Sources

1858 births
1939 deaths
People from Greenville, Ohio
National Normal University alumni
College of Wooster alumni
Physicians from Ohio
Mayors of places in Ohio
Republican Party members of the United States House of Representatives from Ohio